Ratan Talao Gurdwara is a gurdwara located on Preddy Street, Karachi, Pakistan.

History
The gurdwara was founded in pre-partition India and was named after Shiri Guru Sikh Sabah. It holds significance for Sikhs as during the partition of India, in 1947, around 250 Sikhs were murdered at this place.

In 1958, a government college, named Government Ziauddin Memorial College Nabi Bagh, was started as a private school on the premises of gurdwara. Later, in 1972, it was nationalized.

References

Gurdwaras in Pakistan
Schools in Karachi